Thomas Kieth Martin (born Middlesboro, Kentucky, September 25, 1960) is an American fantasy author.

Books

The Delgroth Trilogy
A Two-Edged Sword (1994) 
A Matter of Honor (1994) 
A Call to Arms (1995)

Magelord Trilogy
Magelord: The Awakening (1997) 
Magelord: The Time of Madness (1998) 
Magelord: The House of Bairn (1999)

External links
Thomas K. Martin homepage
Books by Thomas K. Martin

1960 births
Living people
20th-century American novelists
American fantasy writers
American male novelists
20th-century American male writers